Logitech Harmony is a line of remote controls and home automation products produced by Logitech. The line includes universal remote products designed for controlling the components of home theater systems (including televisions, set-top boxes, DVD and Blu-ray players, video game consoles) and other devices that can be controlled via infrared, as well as newer smart home hub products that can be used to additionally control supported Internet of things (IoT) and Smart home products, and allow the use of mobile apps to control devices. On April 10, 2021, Logitech announced that they would discontinue Harmony Remote manufacturing.

History
The Harmony remote control was originally created in 2001 by Easy Zapper, a Canadian company, and first sold in November 2001. The company later changed its name to Intrigue Technologies and was located in Mississauga, Ontario, Canada. Computer peripheral manufacturer Logitech acquired it in May 2004 for US$29 million, turning Harmony remotes into a worldwide phenomenon.

In April 2021, Logitech announced the decision to discontinue the manufacturing of Harmony remotes.  Any remaining Harmony remote inventory will continue to be available through retailers for new customers, and support will continue to be offered.

Features
All Harmony remotes are set up online using an external configuration software. For all models this can be done using a computer running Microsoft Windows or MacOS to which they need to be connected via USB cable; the Elite and Ultimate models can also be configured wirelessly using a smartphone app for Android or iOS.

Each remote has  infrared (IR) learning capability (some later models also include RF support), and can upload information about a new remote to an online device database.  5000+ brands of devices were supported.

All Harmony remotes support one-touch activity based control, which allows control of multiple devices at once. For example, a home theater setup might include a TV, a digital set top box and a home theater sound system. Pressing the 'Watch TV' activity button on the remote will turn on the TV, turn on digital set top box, turn on the sound system, switch the input of TV to the digital set top box and switch the input of the sound system to the set top box. In addition, the volume buttons would be mapped to the sound system, the channel buttons would be mapped to the digital set to box, and other controls to the most appropriate system component for the activity.

Harmony Remote software
The remote software allows users to update the remote configuration, learn IR commands, and upgrade the remote control's firmware.

Early versions of the remote software required a web browser; newer versions are Java-based. The software requires constant Internet connectivity while programming the remote, as remote control codes are downloaded from Logitech. This method allows updates to the product database, remote codes, and macro sequences to be easily distributed. This also allows Logitech to survey their market in order to determine products for investigation and research. Harmony control software is available for Microsoft Windows and Mac OS X. A group of developers was working on Harmony Remote software for the Linux operating system;  the latest available release was dated August 2010.

On March 31, 2010, Logitech launched a new website called "My Harmony" for setting up several later Harmony remote controls.

On April 10, 2021, Logitech announced that they would discontinue Harmony Remote manufacturing.

Current products
As of November 2019, the current products being sold in the Harmony line are:

Harmony 650/665

The lowest-cost version of the Harmony remote that contains a display screen, which is color. It can be programmed with multiple activities and up to 8 devices.

Harmony Express

The Express uses Amazon Alexa to navigate, via a smaller distinct remote. It is the only Harmony remote that supports voice-activated search.

Harmony Hub
This device is not a remote, but rather a hub that can control IR and Bluetooth devices, as well as certain smart home devices (e.g. Philips Hue, Nest thermostat). It is controlled by certain Harmony remotes as well iOS/Android based apps, and more recently Alexa can control certain functions. By itself, it can control up to 8 home theater devices and an amount of home automation devices. A lot of the current products include this along with the remote. This replaces the older Harmony Ultimate Hub, Harmony Home Hub and Harmony Link devices.

Harmony Smart Control
Includes a Harmony Home Hub and a simple remote control that contains three activity buttons used to activate up to 6 different activities. The simple remote lacks a display screen, and can also be purchased separately for those who already own a Harmony Home Hub. Supports up to 8 devices.

Harmony Companion (formerly Harmony Home Control)
Like the Harmony Smart Control described above, but the included Simple Remote also contains home automation controls. Like the Smart Control Simple Remote, the included remote lacks a display screen, but it cannot be purchased for Home Hub owners unlike the Smart Control remote.

Harmony Smart Keyboard
This includes the Harmony Hub along with a keyboard containing a built-in touchpad. The keyboard appears to be like Logitech's previous K400 keyboard and touchpad combo, except some of the keys and buttons have been replaced with others more useful to a home theater remote, and two numbered, Harmony-specific USB receivers are included. It lacks a display screen, supports three activities (Watch a Movie, Watch TV, and Listen to Music), and can also be purchased as an add-on accessory for Harmony Home Hub owners. It controls up to 8 devices.

Harmony Touch
The Harmony Touch remote control contains a full-color display screen with touch functionality. It is an IR remote that supports up to 15 devices and multiple activities. It lacks dedicated physical buttons for home automation control. This remote can be added to a Harmony Hub for additional functionality. No longer available from the manufacturer, but still available via retail.

Harmony 950/Harmony Elite/Harmony Pro

The current top of the range Harmony available via retail. The Harmony 950 is a redesigned version of the Harmony Ultimate One with the addition of dedicated physical buttons for home automation control. Other changes include the media transport control buttons being relocated to a more ergonomic location, and the addition of user accessible battery compartment. This remote can be added to a Harmony Hub for additional functionality. The Harmony Elite is a bundle containing both the Harmony 950 remote control and the Harmony Hub. The Harmony Pro is the Harmony Elite bundle sold for professional installers.

Harmony Pro 2400

The Pro 2400 is the only Harmony product that includes a hub with an ethernet port, as well as power-over-ethernet (POE) support. The hub is significantly wider, and comes with a detachable directional antenna. It also has six, 3.5mm jacks for IR sensors (versus two, 2.5mm jacks on other Hub products). It uses the Elite remote, and is only available through professional installers.

Accessories
E-R0001

The Harmony E-R0001 is an IR to Bluetooth adapter for the PS3.

RF Wireless Extender

The Harmony RF Wireless Extender allows some Harmony remotes, e.g., models 890, 1000 and 1100, to control devices using radio frequencies instead of infrared, with longer range than infrared and no need for line-of-sight transmission. The Harmony 1000 can use two RF Extenders, while the 1100 can use multiple extenders.

IR Extender System

The Harmony IR Extender System has an IR blaster and a set of mini blasters, and does not require programming. It is manufactured by Philips and rebadged.

Discontinued products

Harmony 350

The lowest-budget version of the Harmony remote, which can control up to 8 devices in particular categories, and supports only one activity: Watch TV. Unlike most current and former products in the Harmony line, this model lacks a display screen.

Harmony Ultimate One/Harmony Ultimate

The Harmony Ultimate One remote control is a revised version of the Harmony Touch adding motion-activated back-lit keys, eyes-free gesture control, tilt sensor and vibration feedback. This remote can be added to a Harmony Hub for additional functionality. The Harmony Ultimate is a bundle containing both the Harmony Ultimate One remote control and the Harmony Hub but this pack is no longer available from the manufacturer, but still available via retail.

Harmony Ultimate Home

Includes the Harmony Home Hub and a remote similar to the above described Harmony Ultimate One. The package includes four IR emitters, the remote, the hub, and two IR extenders that plug into the hub. Pressing a button on the included remote or any add-on remote will first communicate with the hub, then the hub will tell the one of the four IR emitters based on configuration (including the IR emitter on the remote) to transmit the command. Harmony Ultimate Home also contains home automation controls, unlike the Ultimate One. The remote can't be purchased separately for Home Hub owners, unlike most of the other remotes that include it. It supports a maximum of 15 devices.

Harmony Link
A device which utilizes a mobile app as a remote to control devices within the room. It has since been succeeded by the newer Harmony Hub product, which also supports controlling Smart home products. On November 8, 2017, Logitech announced that it would end support for the Harmony Link and make the devices inoperable after March 18, 2018, citing an expired security certificate for a component in the platform. Following criticism of Logitech's originally-announced plan to do so for users whose devices were still under warranty, Logitech announced on November 10, 2017, that it would exchange all Harmony Links for Harmony Hubs free-of-charge, regardless of warranty status.

Harmony 500 series
The Harmony 500 remotes are mid-range remotes that is similar in functionality to the Harmony 659 and 670, but with different button arrangements and a squared-off physical design compared to the hourglass design of the 6xx series. Compared to today's offerings, these remotes offered control of up to 15 devices at an affordable price. The remotes have a back-lit monochrome LCD screen. The 500 series seems to be discontinued entirely.

Harmony for Xbox 360
While it's marketed for the Xbox 360 segment, this remote must be said to be part of the 5xx series. It runs the same software. The Harmony 360 is pre-configured to be used with the Xbox 360 console, and has special buttons, X, Y, A, B and media center control, correlating with the same as found on native Xbox controllers. It has a back-lit LCD screen and uses four AAA batteries.
The hardware layout is mostly the same as the 550. The extra up/down arrows of the 550 is removed to make room for the colored X, Y, A and B buttons beneath the play and pause rows. This would make it the remote in the 500 series with the most hardware buttons, 54 (counting the four direction arrow keys). It can control up to 12 devices.

Harmony 510/515
The Harmony 510/515 is an entry-level remote that is essentially a replacement to the 500 series and the Xbox 360 version. It has the same number of buttons as the 525 and features colored buttons typical on most satellite boxes. It has a four-button, monochrome LCD display. This remote is software limited to controlling up to five devices. Like its mid-range cousins, the 520 and 550, it has no recharge pod and uses AAA batteries instead. Unlike previous 500 series models, these newer models have been limited to 5 devices in software, yet sell for the same prices.

Difference between 510/515:
The 510 is black; the 515 is silver.

Harmony 520/525
The Harmony 520 is a mid-range remote that is similar in functionality to the Harmony 659 and 670, but with a different button arrangement and a squared-off physical design compared to the hourglass design of the 6xx series. It has a blue back-light and monochrome LCD screen. These 5xx models are equipped with an infrared learning port to learn IR signals of unsupported or unknown devices. By pointing an original remote control at the Harmony's learning port, it is able to copy and reproduce those codes and, in the case of supported devices, it is able to figure out what the remote is used to control and imports that device. They require 4 AAA batteries. A mini USB port is used to connect these to a computer for programming.

Difference between 520/525:
The 525 has 50 buttons, while the 520 has 46. It lacks the red, green, yellow and blue colour buttons commonly used for things like teletext and PVR control. Apparently, the 520 is the American model while the 525 is the European. The 520 and 525 can control up to 12 and 15 devices respectively.

Harmony 550/555
The harmony 550/555 remotes are variants of the 525 remote. Compared to the model 525, the 550 and 555 have two extra buttons, and are made of higher grade materials with different colors. The 550 and 555 models both have a sound and a picture button that changes the button mapping on the remote, allowing for reuse of the same physical buttons for different set of functionality. 52 buttons.

Difference between 550/555:
The 550 and 555 have the same number and placement of buttons, just with different mapping. The 555 have the same color buttons as the 525. The 550 does not, instead it has the following extra functions: Up arrow, Down arrow, A and B buttons. The 555 has orange back-light, the 550 has blue.

Harman/Kardon TC 30
The Harman/Kardon TC 30 appears to be a redesigned, rebranded Harmony 52x with a cradle and a color LCD. The LCD has eight items compared to the four of the rest of the Harmony 5xx series. Images exist of the TC 30 both with and without the teletext color buttons. This might mean that there's one version based on the 520 and one based on the 525. The key layout is identical to the 52x remotes. It seems to require different software from the Logitech branded remotes — however at the moment you can download this software from Logitech via harmonyremote.com.

Harmony 610
The Harmony 610 is functionally identical to the Harmony 670 and Harmony 620, but comes in black with a silver face panel. The 610 can control a maximum of 5 devices.

Harmony 620
The Harmony 620 is functionally identical to the Harmony 670, but comes in black instead of silver/black. The 670 can control up to 15 devices, where the 620 can only control 12 devices.

Harmony 659

The Harmony 659 is another mid-range universal remote that offers most of the functionality in the Harmony line. It has a monochrome LCD screen.

Harmony 670

The Harmony 670 is a mid-range universal remote that offers most of the functionality in the Harmony line. The 670 has a monochrome LCD screen and puts DVR functions in the middle of the remote. Logitech has discontinued this product.

Harmony 680

The Harmony 680 is a mid-range, computer programmable universal remote. The 680 has a back lit monochrome LCD screen, and Media PC specific.
buttons. Unlike many newer Harmony remotes, the 680 is able to control up to 15 devices.

Harmony 688

The Harmony 688 was (no longer produced) a mid-range, computer programmable universal remote. The H688 has a monochrome LCD screen and is back lit by an Electro Luminescent sheet (blue in color).

Harmony 720
The Harmony 720 was initially offered exclusively through Costco in 2006 and featured a color screen and backlit keys. It was designed as an inexpensive competitor to the earlier Harmony 880, with few differences, except for the ergonomic design and key layout. It is now available through other vendors, but remains unlisted on Logitech's product page.

The harmony 720 remote is closely related to the 500 series, as it has a square shape and a layout akin to those remotes. When compared to the 525, you will find the same buttons above the LCD. The 720 has a colour LCD with six buttons/activities instead of four. The eight play/stop etc. buttons have been moved to the lower part. The Mute and Prev buttons have been moved and in their place, there are extra up and down buttons — same as on the 550. Compared to the 500 series, the glow button has been removed. These remotes do not have the Sound and Picture buttons to change key mappings, like the 550/555 remotes does. Lacking red, green, yellow and blue colour buttons, the 720 has 49 buttons. It can control up to 12 devices.

Harmony 768

The Harmony 768 is a capsule-shaped remote with a backlit LCD screen it was available in silver, blue or red. It has 32 buttons, as well as a clickable thumb-wheel to scroll through and select activities.

Harmony 785
The harmony 785 is nearly identical to the 720. While the 720 has 49 buttons, the 785 has 53. The extra buttons are the red, green, yellow and blue colour buttons commonly used for things like teletext and PVR control. These are located above the number buttons, which are placed further down compared to the 720. Another difference from the 720 is that the 785 can control up to 15 devices.

Harmony 880/885
The Harmony 880 was the first Harmony with a color LCD screen and a rechargeable battery. The Harmony 885 remote has extra buttons as mentioned below. The 885 replaces up and down keys with four color keys used for Teletext and, more recently, by some set-top boxes.

There was a short-lived 880Pro that had the picture and sound buttons. This remote did not feature multi-room/multi-controller support like the 890Pro.

Difference between 880/885:
The 885 has the red, green, yellow and blue colour buttons commonly used for things like teletext and PVR control. These four buttons occupy the same space where the 880 has two selection buttons (up arrow, down arrow).

Harmony 890/895
The Harmony 890/895 is the same as the 880/885, but it adds radio frequency (RF) capability, enabling the remote to control devices even without line-of-sight to and from different rooms, up to a range of 30 meters. This remote control cannot control proprietary RF devices, but it can control special Z-Wave RF devices, as well as IR devices without line-of-sight via the RF extender.

The 890Pro adds multi-room and multi-controller support, as well as a different color scheme. (Primary and secondary remotes can be set up that work with the same wireless extender) It also adds two buttons — picture and sound — that allow for quick access to picture- and sound-related commands. It is not listed on the Logitech Web site and is sold through custom installation companies. The 890Pro is not shipped with the RF extender.

{Yet to Add}: Difference between 890/895:

Harmony 1000
The Harmony 1000 has customizable touch screen commands, sounds and a rechargeable battery, and allows control up to 15 devices. It is also compatible with the RF extender. A maximum of two extenders can be configured within the software.

Harmony 300
The universal remote has 1 activity support (Watch TV), and control up to 4 devices. The remote supports customizes key with remote features and favorite channels. This remote has no LCD, and like the discontinued 500 series mid-range models, no battery charge pod. Requires two AA batteries.

Harmony 300i
Similar to the Harmony 300, but has a glossy finish rather than a matte finish.

Harmony 600
Support for up to 5 devices. Monochrome display. Requires 2 AA batteries.

Harmony 650
Support for up to 8 devices. Color display. Requires 2 AA batteries.

Harmony 700
Support for up to 6 devices. Color display. Rechargeable AA batteries via USB.

Harmony One
The Harmony One features a color touch screen and is rechargeable. It does not offer any RF capability. A CNET TV review stated that it is one of the best universal remotes on the market today.

Harmony 900
Harmony 900 has the same ergonomics design as Harmony One. It has additional four color buttons compared to Harmony One and RF supported. The RF technology used by Harmony 900 is not comparable with Harmony 890, 1000, and 1100. The Harmony 900 and 1100 models do not support "sequences" (Logitech parlance for macros).

Harmony 1100
Adds QVGA resolution to the touch screen and allows 15 devices to be controlled.
The user interface of the Harmony 1100 is now Flash based vs the Java based one found in the Harmony 1000.

See also
Universal Remote Controls - General Article on Universal Remote Controls.
JP1 remote - Universal Electronics/One For All range of programmable remotes

References

External links
 Harmony at Logitech.com

Assistive technology
Remote control
Smart home hubs
Harmony